Liver and onions is a dish consisting of slices of liver (usually pork, beef, chicken or, in the United Kingdom, lamb) and bulb onions. The liver and the onions are usually sautéed or otherwise cooked together, but sometimes they may be sautéed separately and mixed together afterwards. The liver is often cut in fine slices, but it also may be diced.

Description
Liver and onions is widely eaten in the United States, United Kingdom, Canada and in Germany, where it is usually eaten along with boiled or mashed potatoes. Beef or veal liver is common in the USA, veal or lamb liver are the usual choices in the UK. Liver and onions is often accompanied by fried bacon.

In the French traditional recipe the liver is fried  with butter and bacon. In Catalan cuisine olive oil is used, instead of butter, and fried garlic is added to the mixture. In Italian cuisine, the fegato alla veneziana ("Venice-style liver") recipe includes a dash of red wine or vinegar and the fegato alla romana ("Rome-style liver") a dash of white wine and is cooked in lard.

In the United States liver and onions has long been an iconic staple of many diner-style restaurants. It is served either dry, with the liver, onions and sometimes bacon simply sauteed and heaped together, or the onions can be turned into a gravy or sauce, with stock and flour added, and with the liver returned to the gravy briefly before plating. This form is sometimes called "smothered liver and onions" but that name is only common in the Deep South states of the USA. Liver and onions is especially common in the regions of Pennsylvania and the Midwest with a strong Germanic culture, for instance in Amish and Mennonite communities, although there is nothing exclusively German about the dish. In large Eastern cities such as New York and Philadelphia, it is simply popular urban diner food.

Beef liver and onions is widely popular in Latin America, where it is often eaten along with tortillas or rice. In Brazil, the traditional recipe calls for potatoes or other root vegetable, prepared most commonly boiled and puréed or as home fries. These recipes have also migrated up to the large Latin populations in several US cities and are often found on Honduran, Columbian, Cuban and D.R. menus. One typical US Latin recipe includes tomato and capsicum pepper to make a "criollo" gravy for the liver and onion.

Variants
There are variants of this dish using chicken and lamb livers. These are popular in Spain, among other countries.

See also
 Calf's liver and bacon
 List of onion dishes

References

External links

 Foie aux oignons French recipe  

American cuisine
British cuisine
French cuisine
German cuisine
Italian cuisine
Liver (food)
Israeli cuisine
Spanish cuisine
Polish cuisine
Venezuelan cuisine
Onion-based foods
Food combinations
Berlin cuisine